Myrtle Gonzalez (September 28, 1891 – October 22, 1918) was an American actress. She starred in at least 78 silent era motion pictures from 1913 to 1917, of which 66 were one and two-reel shorts. She is regarded as a movie star.

Gonzalez was best known for her role as Enid Maitland in Vitagraph's six-reel feature length drama The Chalice of Courage (1915) opposite William Duncan. A magazine writer once called her "The Virgin White Lily of the Screen".

Early life 

Myrtle Gonzalez was born in Los Angeles, California on September 28, 1891, the daughter of Manuel George Gonzalez (1868–1919) and Lillian L. Cook (1874–1932). Her siblings were Stella M. Gonzalez (1892–1965) and Manuel G. Gonzalez Jr. (1898–?).

Her father's family was a Hispanic Californio family of Mexico, which had long settled this territory before the US took it over. Her mother, the daughter of immigrants from Ireland, was a former opera and popular singer. Her father was a retail grocer.

From early childhood, Myrtle displayed remarkable dramatic talent, and she had a good soprano voice. She appeared in many local concerts and benefits and sang in church choirs. She later played juvenile parts on the stage with Fanny Davenport and Florence Stone.

Gonzalez married James Parks Jones circa 1910. They had one son together, James Parks Jones Jr., before they divorced.

Movie career

Because she grew up in Los Angeles, the shift of movie production to her hometown was a big advantage for her. Gonzalez worked for such studios as Vitagraph and Universal.

She appeared in five movies opposite William Desmond Taylor at Vitagraph: the comedy/drama Her Husband's Friend (1913), the drama Tainted Money (1914), the comedy Millions for Defence (1914), the drama The Kiss (1914), and the drama Captain Alvarez (1914).

In many of her roles, Gonzalez typified a vigorous out-of-doors type of heroine. During the last six years of her career, many of the movies she starred in were stories of the snow country and of the forests.

Personal life and death
On December 1, 1917, she and actor/director Allen Watt (1885–1944) were married in Los Angeles. She gave up her screen work and retired. They had met when Watt was working as an assistant director at Universal. By the time of their marriage, the US had entered World War I and Watt was an officer in the US Army. He was stationed at  Camp Lewis, near Tacoma, Washington. 

As Gonzalez's health was too frail for the climate, Capt. Watt was placed on the retirement list, so he could return her to Southern California. He went back to work at Universal and began directing.

Gonzalez, at age 27, died during the worldwide Spanish flu pandemic of 1918. At the time of her death, she was at her parents' home in Los Angeles, at 908 West Thirtieth Street.

On November 23, 2022, Google featured her in a Google Doodle in the United States. November 23 is the anniversary of the release of the short film The Level (1914), in which she starred.

Selected filmography
Chalice of Courage (1915)
A Natural Man (1915)
 The Girl of Lost Lake (1916)
 It Happened in Honolulu (1916)
The Secret of the Swamp (1916)
 The Greater Law (1917) 
 Mutiny (1917)
God's Crucible (1917)
 Southern Justice (1917)
 The Show Down (1917)

Bibliography
Doyle, Billy H. (1995). The Ultimate Directory of Silent Screen Performers. pp. 30–31. Metuchen, New Jersey, Scarecrow Press. .

References

External links

 
Biography

1891 births
1918 deaths
American film actresses
American actresses of Mexican descent
American people of Irish descent
American silent film actresses
American stage actresses
Actresses from Los Angeles
Deaths from the Spanish flu pandemic in California
20th-century American actresses
Hispanic and Latino American actresses